Daren Fach is a Site of Special Scientific Interest in Merthyr Tydfil, south Wales.

See also
List of Sites of Special Scientific Interest in Mid & South Glamorgan

Sites of Special Scientific Interest in Merthyr Tydfil County Borough